His Majesty, Bunker Bean is a 1918 American silent comedy film directed by William Desmond Taylor and written by Julia Crawford Ivers and Harry Leon Wilson. The film stars Jack Pickford, Louise Huff, Jack McDonald, Frances Clanton, Peggy O'Connell, and Edythe Chapman. The film was released by Paramount Pictures on April 8, 1918.

Plot
As described in a film magazine, through a clairvoyant Bunker Bean (Pickford) learns that in his various incarnations he has been Napoleon and Ramtah, an Egyptian king, and these facts spur him to greater things. He falls heir to some money and invests in stock which yields big returns and in a mummy of Ramtah, his first incarnation. He marries the daughter of his boss and, although at first afraid to face her parents, he summons the personages of his various incarnations to give him the strength to conquer and win them over.

Cast 
Jack Pickford as Bunker Bean
Louise Huff as Breede's daughter
Jack McDonald as Jim Breede
Frances Clanton as Mrs. Wife
Peggy O'Connell as Breede's oldest daughter
Edythe Chapman as Older Mrs. Breede
Jack Hoxie as The greatest pitcher 
Gustav von Seyffertitz as Professor Balthasar
Edith M. Lessing as Countess Casanova

Preservation status
The picture is lost.

Warner Brothers remade the film in 1925 starring Matt Moore. That film survives abridged or incomplete.

References

External links 
 

1918 films
1910s English-language films
Silent American comedy films
1918 comedy films
Paramount Pictures films
Films directed by William Desmond Taylor
American black-and-white films
Lost American films
American silent feature films
1918 lost films
Lost comedy films
1910s American films